Habra is a city and a municipality under Barasat sadar subdivision in North 24 Parganas district of the Indian state of West Bengal. It is situated on the Jessore Road between Kolkata and the Bangladesh border at Petrapole. Its location makes it an important town for export and import of goods between India and Bangladesh.

Geography

Location
It has an average elevation of 13 metres (42 feet).

Area overview
The area covered in the map alongside is largely a part of the north Bidyadhari Plain. located in the lower Ganges Delta. The country is flat. It is a little raised above flood level and the highest ground borders the river channels. 54.67% of the people of the densely populated area lives in the urban areas and 45.33% lives in the rural  areas.

Note: The map alongside presents some of the notable locations in the subdivision. All places marked in the map are linked in the larger full screen map.

Demographics
According to the 2011 Census of India, Habra had a total population of 147,221, of which 74,592 (51%) were males and 72,629 (49%) were females. Population in the age range 0–6 years was 11,696. The total number of literate persons in Habra was 121,952 (89.98% of the population over 6 years).

According to the 2011 Census of India, Habra Urban Agglomeration had a total population of 304,584, of which 154,863 (51%) were males and 149,723 (49%) were females. Population in the age range 0–6 years was 23,023. The total number of literate persons in Habra UA was 256,313 (91.03% of the population over 6 years). The constituents of Habra Urban Agglomeration were Habra (M), Ashoknagar Kalyangarh (M), Bara Bamonia (CT), Guma (CT), Anarbaria (CT) and Khorddabamonia (CT).

As of 2001 India census, Habra had a population of 127,695. Males constitute 51% of the population and females 49%. Habra has an average literacy rate of 79%, higher than the national average of 59.5%: male literacy is 83%, and female literacy is 74%. In Habra, 10% of the population is under 6 years of age.

Administration

Municipality 
Habra Municipality is responsible for the well-being of its residence. Habra Municipality recently installed tower lights from the MLA fund of Jyotipriyo Mullick.

Police station 
Habra police station is one of the most important police stations in North 24 Parganas District. It has jurisdiction over Habra municipality, Gobardanga municipality and Habra I CD Block.

Others 
Habra I (community development block) is headquartered at Prafulla Nagar, Habra.
Habra Telephone Exchange is also headquartered at Habra. Habra is one of the 100 selected cities in India which will be developed as a smart city within 2022 though this has been in question recently when Govt of India published an updated list and Habra did not appear in that apparently.

Transport

Railway System

It is 45 km from Sealdah Station and 25 km from Barasat on the Sealdah-Bangaon branch line of Eastern Railway. It is part of the Kolkata Suburban Railway system. Habra, Gobardanga and Bangaon local connects this town to Sealdah Station and other stations of the Sealdah-Bangaon branch line. Habra Station Road is directly connected on NH 35 (Jessore Road). It is a major railway station between bangaon and barasat railway station.

Govt. Bus Routes

West Bengal Transport Corporation Bus Routes (WBTC)
ACT8  Habra—Digha (AC)
 
C43  Habra—Garia
 
C51 Habra—Naihati—Nabanna
 
D2  Habra—Naihati
 
D7  Barasat—Bagdah—Esplanade
 
D7/1  Bagdah—Howrah Station
 
D9  Esplanade—Hakimpur
 
D18  Thakurnagar—Howrah
 
D22  Habra—Howrah
 
D22A  Habra—Esplanade
 
D31  Srinathpur—Esplanade
 
E19  Habra—Digha
 
E19A Habra—Digha
 
E20 Habra—Durgapur
 
E25  Habra—Esplanade—Santragachi
 
E25A Habra—Esplanade
 
E33  Habra—Anthpur
 
E36  Habra—Nabanna—Santragachi
 
E36A  Habra—Park Circus
 
E41  Habra—Asansol
 
E47  Nahata—Howrah
 
E47A Habra—Howrah
 
E51/A Habra—Bishnupur
 
E61  Habra—Bakkhali
 
E66 Habra—Rampurhat
 
E67 Habra—Purulia

E67A Habra—Bankura
 
E68  Habra—Haldia
 
E70 Habra—Jhargram

E76 Habra–Kalyani (Via-Kachua,Sendanga,Rajberia,AIIMS)

South Bengal State Transport Corporation Bus Routes (SBSTC)
Habra-Bankura
Habra-Digha
Habra-Haldia
Habra-Medinipur
Habra-Suri
Habra-Durgapur
Habra-Purulia
Habra-Jhargram
Habra-Asansol
Habra-Rampurhat (via-Krishnanagar, Plassey, Berhampore)
Bangaon-Asansol
Bangaon-Tarapith
Bangaon-Medinipur

North Bengal State Transport Corporation Bus Routes (NBSTC)
 
Habra-Coochbehar (Via Awalsiddhi Chowmatha, Krishnanagar, Baharampur, Malda, Gazole Town, Raiganj, Itahar, Dhupguri, Maynaguri, Jalpaiguri, Siliguri)

Private Bus Route
DN12/1  Habra-Nazat
DN21  Habra - Bagjola
DN35  Nabatkati-Balti-Barasat (Simanta Express)
DN44  Bangaon-Dakshineswar
MM5  Habra-Barrackpore Court
MN3  Nahata-Barasat
MN6  Berigopalpur-Barasat
73  Habra-Naihati
95  Ashoknagar-Bangaon

Buses Without Number
 Habra-Ranaghat
 Habra-Shyambazar 
 Bagdah-Digha
 Thakurnagar - Nabadwip
 Hakimpur - Digha
 Gaighata - Shyambazar
 Hasnabad - Bandel (Habra— Jaguli)

Education

Jawahar Navodaya Vidyalaya (Banipur)
Habra High School(H.S), North 24 Parganas
</ref> Hijalpukuria, Sreenagar, Habra, West Bengal 743263
03216 237 053 https://g.co/kgs/bwYF9S

See also
 Habra I CD Block
 Habra II CD Block
 Map of Habra I CD Block on Page 289 of District Census Handbook. It also shows the location of Habra.

References

Cities and towns in North 24 Parganas district
Cities in West Bengal